The Japanese Regional Leagues, the fifth tier of the Japanese association football league system, played a regular season in 2021.

Champions list

Hokkaido 
The tournament was terminated on August 26 due to the restrictions caused by the Covid-19 pandemic.

League table at the time of abandonment

Tohoku

Division 1 
The tournament was terminated on Sep 6 due to the restrictions caused by the Covid-19 pandemic.

League table at the time of abandonment

Division 2 North 
The tournament was terminated due to the restrictions caused by the Covid-19 pandemic.

League table at the time of abandonment

Division 2 South 
The tournament was terminated due to the restrictions caused by the Covid-19 pandemic.

League table at the time of abandonment

Kantō

Division 1

Division 2

Kantō Playoffs

Div 1/Div 2

Div 2/Prefectural

Hokushinetsu

Division 1

Division 2

Tōkai

Division 1 
The tournament was terminated due to the restrictions caused by the Covid-19 pandemic.

League table at the time of abandonment

Division 2 
The tournament was terminated due to the restrictions caused by the Covid-19 pandemic.

League table at the time of abandonment

Kansai

Division 1

Division 2 

Notes

Chūgoku

Shikoku 
The tournament was terminated on August 11 due to the restrictions caused by the Covid-19 pandemic.

League table at the time of abandonment

Kyushu
In the Kyushu Soccer League, drawn games were decided on penalty shootouts. The winners of these shootouts were awarded two points, while the losers were awarded one.

See also 
Japan Football Association (JFA)
League(s)
J.League
2021 J1 League (Tier 1)
2021 J2 League (Tier 2)
2021 J3 League (Tier 3)
2021 Japan Football League (JFL) (Tier 4)
2021 Regional Champions League (Promotion playoffs to JFL)
Cup(s)
2021 Fuji Xerox Super Cup
2021 Emperor's Cup (National Open Cup)
2021 J.League YBC Levain Cup (League Cup)

References 
RSSSF

2021
2021 in Japanese football leagues
Japan